Antarcturidae is a family of marine isopods belonging to the suborder Valvifera.

Genera
There are 17 genera:

References

Valvifera
Crustacean families